Jahangir Alam Chowdhury, (born 2 February 1953 in Munshiganj District, East Pakistan) is a retired three-star general of the Bangladesh Army and former Chief of the Bangladesh Rifles during the conflicts with Border Security Force of India and skirmishes with Banga Sena militant group in the Bangladesh–India border.

A former Principal Staff Officer of the Army of Bangladesh he was elevated to the position of Quartermaster general at the same time his Military Academy course-mate Moeen U Ahmed, the Chief of the Army Staff was made first serving Four-star General in national military history. He is widely known to be credited to have gone to the Presidential Palace to ask the President of Bangladesh to declare the State of emergency which led to the Events of 2008 that brought the military in power.

Early life 
Jahangir was born on 2 February 1953 and was commissioned in the Corps of Artillery of Bangladesh Army in 1975. Beginning his career as a Gunner he served in different artillery outfits in various capacities including commanding Two Artillery Brigades and a Field Artillery Regiment.

Career 
Jahangir had also been an instructor in Bangladesh Military Academy. Later he served as a Group Testing Officer (GTO) in Inter Services Selection Board. He got the unique opportunity to serve as United Nations Military Observer and Staff in three different UN Missions between 1994 and 1996 in Bosnia-Herzegovina, Rwanda and Georgia. He is a graduate of Defence Services Command and Staff College and Bangladesh National Defence College, Mirpur, Dhaka.

Trained both at home and abroad Jahangir served in number of Command, Staff and Instructional assignments of Bangladesh Army. Apart from Artillery outfits, he commanded Bangladesh Rifles for a significant period - in the rank of Major General as Director General and in the rank of Colonel as Sector Commander. He was assigned with staff responsibilities in Bangladesh Army Headquarters as Master General of Ordnance, Military secretary, Director of Inspectorate of Technical Development and General Staff Officer - 1St Grade in Military Intelligence Directorate. He was also the Assistant Adjutant and Quartermaster in HQ 66 Infantry Division and General Staff Officer - II (Coordination) in Bangladesh Military Academy. He served as the chairman of Bangladesh Diesel Plant, an army operated manufacturing company. He was the Principal Staff Officer of Armed Forces Division.

Relations with India
Chowdhury exclaimed at a press briefing after talks with Indian Home Minister Swami Chinmayanand that India was harboring 90 terrorist camps of anti-Bangladesh separatists. He played a controversial role in blaming India for the grenade attacks which took place on 17 August 2005. The Foreign Ministry of Bangladesh said that the Indian newspapers presented a distorted version of his earlier statement and that he actually said that some Indian criminals might have been involved in the countrywide bomb blasts in Bangladesh. Relations suffered between the two countries as the Indian Ministry of External Affairs issued a statement saying "Government of India is deeply shocked and dismayed at the remarks. This is a baseless and scurrilous allegation and is all the more shocking because it has been made against a friendly country and particularly after the two countries have had useful and constructive talks between the Bangladesh Rifles and Border Security Force". He further claimed that Indian militants might have crossed into Bangladesh territory to perform the acts. In a separate incidence reported by BBC, India accused BDR of intruding into their Air Space with a few helicopters, which General Chowdhury denied and said that BDR has one helicopter which was then kept with Bangladesh Army. He accused the Indian Army of supporting Banga Sena, a banned militant group in Bangladesh.

The Mutiny of 2009
In 2009, his immediate successor, the then Chief of BDR Major General Shakil Ahmed was shot and killed along with his wife during the 2009 Bangladesh Rifles revolt. As QMG, General Chowdhury headed the Army Enquiry Committee. On 3 December 2009 he was transferred to the Foreign Ministry. He was retired from Army on 2 February 2010.

Personal life 
Jahangir is married to Mrs Laila Arzu and they have a son Dr Rishad Choudhury Robin and a daughter Ms Rasna Choudhury Liz.

See also
 2001 Indian–Bangladeshi border conflict

References

Living people
1953 births
Bangladesh Army generals
Director Generals of Border Guards Bangladesh
Principal Staff Officers (Bangladesh)